Bridge in Franconia Township is a historic stone arch bridge spanning Skippack Creek at Elvoy in Franconia Township, Montgomery County, Pennsylvania. The bridge was built in 1837 and reconstructed in 1874.

The bridge was listed on the National Register of Historic Places in 1988.

See also
List of bridges documented by the Historic American Engineering Record in Pennsylvania

References

External links

Road bridges on the National Register of Historic Places in Pennsylvania
Bridges completed in 1837
Bridges in Montgomery County, Pennsylvania
Historic American Engineering Record in Pennsylvania
National Register of Historic Places in Montgomery County, Pennsylvania
Stone arch bridges in the United States